Andreas Chyliński (also known as Andrzej Chyliński) (b. ca. 1590 in Poland; d. after 1635 in Padua) was a Polish composer.

His life is not well known; between 1630 and 1635 he lived as a Franciscan Friar in Padua, where he was maestro di cappella at the church of Sant'Antonio. Of his music, sixteen canons survive.

1590s births
17th-century deaths
Polish Baroque composers
Italian male classical composers
17th-century Italian composers
Italian Baroque composers
17th-century male musicians

Polish composers
Polish male classical composers
17th-century classical composers